Arluno (locally Arlugn ) is a comune (municipality) in the Metropolitan City of Milan in the Italian region Lombardy, located about  west of Milan.

Arluno borders the following municipalities: Parabiago, Nerviano, Pogliano Milanese, Casorezzo, Vanzago, Ossona, Sedriano, Santo Stefano Ticino, Vittuone, and Corbetta.

Twin towns
Arluno is twinned with:

  San Justo, Santa Fe, Argentina, since 2007

References

External links
 Official website

Cities and towns in Lombardy
Articles which contain graphical timelines